The fifth season of the American crime drama series The Sopranos aired on HBO from March 7 to June 6, 2004. The fifth season was released on DVD in region 1 on June 7, 2005.

The story of season five focuses on the return of two prominent members of the DiMeo family, Tony Blundetto and Feech La Manna, who are released from lengthy stays in prison and struggle to reintegrate themselves back within the family and the life of crime. Several prominent members of the Lupertazzi family return from prison, most notably Phil Leotardo.

The subsequent power vacuum caused by the death of boss Carmine creates a growing rift between the New York and New Jersey crime families. Tony and Carmela adjust to their new lives and each other following their separation, which greatly affects their son A.J. Uncle Junior's mental health starts to deteriorate, and Adriana's guilt over her role as an FBI informant grows.

Cast

Main cast
 James Gandolfini as Tony Soprano (13 episodes), the underboss of the DiMeo crime family, whose relationships with his wife and cousins are becoming increasingly confused.
 Lorraine Bracco as Jennifer Melfi (8 episodes), Tony's therapist, who he rekindles his romantic interest in.
 Edie Falco as Carmela Soprano (12 episodes), Tony's wife, who is trying to get a divorce from him but finds it difficult.
 Michael Imperioli as Christopher Moltisanti (13 episodes), a soldier and Tony's cousin by marriage, who struggles to keep his sobriety.
 Dominic Chianese as Corrado "Junior" Soprano, Jr. (7 episodes), Tony's uncle and the boss of the family, who is becoming increasingly detached from reality.
 Steven Van Zandt as Silvio Dante (11 episodes), the family's loyal consigliere.
 Tony Sirico as Paulie "Walnuts" Gualtieri (11 episodes), a short-tempered capo.
 Robert Iler as Anthony Soprano, Jr. (12 episodes), Tony's son, who becomes more defiant after his parents split up.
 Jamie-Lynn Sigler as Meadow Soprano (10 episodes), Tony's daughter.
 Drea de Matteo as Adriana La Cerva (10 episodes), Chris's fiancée, who struggles with her loyalty to him and her forced loyalty to the FBI.
 Aida Turturro as Janice Soprano (6 episodes), Tony's dramatic sister, whose anger starts to become a problem for her family.
 Steven R. Schirripa as Bobby "Bacala" Baccalieri (10 episodes), a kind-hearted capo whose marriage to Janice strains under her anger issues.
 Vincent Curatola as John "Johnny Sack" Sacramoni (9 episodes), the underboss of the Lupertazzi family who finds himself fighting for the top spot.
 John Ventimiglia as Artie Bucco (8 episodes), Tony's estranged non-mob friend who runs a restaurant.
 Kathrine Narducci as Charmaine Bucco (5 episodes), Artie's ex-wife.
 Steve Buscemi as Tony Blundetto (12 episodes), Tony's ex-convict cousin who he gives leeway out of guilt over an incident in their past.

Recurring cast
 Dan Grimaldi as Patsy Parisi (9 episodes), a DiMeo soldier.
 Sharon Angela as Rosalie Aprile (4 episodes), Carmela's best friend.
 Joseph R. Gannascoli as Vito Spatafore (11 episodes), a DiMeo soldier who almost has a dangerous secret about him exposed.
 Frank Vincent as Phil Leotardo (11 episodes), a hot-headed Lupertazzi capo who is released from prison after two decades.
 Robert Funaro as Eugene Pontecorvo (7 episodes), a DiMeo soldier.
 Max Casella as Benny Fazio (7 episodes), a young DiMeo soldier.
 Carl Capotorto as Little Paulie Germani (7 episodes), Paulie's nephew.
 Ray Abruzzo as Little Carmine Lupertazzi (6 episodes), Carmine's dim-witted son that feuds with Johnny over control of the Lupertazzi family.
 Jerry Adler as Herman "Hesh" Rabkin (5 episodes), Tony's Jewish associate.

Episodes

Reception

Critical reviews
The show's fifth season has a 93% approval rating with an average score of 9.30/10 based on 14 reviews on Rotten Tomatoes, with the following critical consensus: "The penultimate season of The Sopranos hurtles toward the series' climax without sacrificing the compelling stories and vibrant characters that made it an acknowledged television classic."

Awards and nominations
56th Primetime Emmy Awards
Award for Outstanding Drama Series
Nomination for Outstanding Lead Actor in a Drama Series (James Gandolfini) (Episode: "Where's Johnny?")
Nomination for Outstanding Lead Actress in a Drama Series (Edie Falco) (Episode: "All Happy Families")
Nomination for Outstanding Supporting Actor in a Drama Series (Steve Buscemi) (Episodes: "Rat Pack" + "Marco Polo")
Award for Outstanding Supporting Actor in a Drama Series (Michael Imperioli) (Episodes: "Irregular Around the Margins" + "Long Term Parking")
Award for Outstanding Supporting Actress in a Drama Series (Drea de Matteo) (Episodes: "Irregular Around the Margins" + "Long Term Parking")
Nomination for Outstanding Directing for a Drama Series (Allen Coulter) (Episode: "Irregular Around the Margins")
Nomination for Outstanding Directing for a Drama Series (Timothy Van Patten) (Episode: "Long Term Parking")
Nomination for Outstanding Writing for a Drama Series (Michael Caleo) (Episode: "Where's Johnny?")
Nomination for Outstanding Writing for a Drama Series (Robin Green, Mitchell Burgess) (Episode: "Irregular Around the Margins")
Nomination for Outstanding Writing for a Drama Series (Matthew Weiner, Terrence Winter) (Episode: "Unidentified Black Males")
Award for Outstanding Writing for a Drama Series (Terrence Winter) (Episode: "Long Term Parking")

11th Screen Actors Guild Awards
Nomination for Outstanding Performance by a Male Actor in a Drama Series (James Gandolfini)
Nomination for Outstanding Performance by a Female Actor in a Drama Series (Edie Falco)
Nomination for Outstanding Performance by a Female Actor in a Drama Series (Drea de Matteo)
Nomination for Outstanding Performance by an Ensemble in a Drama Series (Entire Cast)

62nd Golden Globe Awards
Nomination for Best Drama Series
Nomination for Best Actress in a Drama Series (Edie Falco)
Nomination for Best Supporting Actor in a Series, Miniseries, or TV Film (Michael Imperioli)
Nomination for Best Supporting Actress in a Series, Miniseries, or TV Film (Drea de Matteo)

Writers Guild of America Awards
Nomination for Best Drama Episode (Terrence Winter) (Episode: "Long Term Parking")

Directors Guild of America Awards
Nomination for Outstanding Directing for a Drama Series (John Patterson) (Episode: "All Due Respect")
Nomination for Outstanding Directing for a Drama Series (Tim Van Patten) (Episode: "Long Term Parking")

20th TCA Awards
Nomination for Program of the Year
Award for Outstanding Achievement in Drama
Nomination for Outstanding Individual Achievement in Drama (Edie Falco)
Nomination for Outstanding Individual Achievement in Drama (James Gandolfini)

References

External links 
 
 

Season 5
2004 American television seasons